Ostracion rhinorhynchos is a species of boxfish commonly known as the horn-nosed boxfish or trunkfish. It was first described by Pieter Bleeker in 1851. It is found in the Indo-West Pacific, where it inhabits coral reefs and eats benthic invertebrates.

References

External links
 

Ostraciidae
Fish described in 1851